Van Hoang is a middle grade fantasy novelist best known for her debut novel Girl Giant and the Monkey King. The sequel, Girl Giant and the Jade War, was published in December 2021.

Hoang has Vietnamese heritage and moved to the United States when she was four years old. Hoang has a BA in English from the University of New Mexico and an MLIS from San Jose State University. She began writing professionally while working as a librarian at Huntington Beach Library in Southern California.

References

External links

 Van Hoang's website
 Goodreads profile

Living people
Year of birth missing (living people)
American people of Vietnamese descent
Vietnamese novelists
21st-century American novelists
American women novelists
University of New Mexico alumni
San Jose State University alumni